Douglas John David Perkins (born April 1943) is a Welsh billionaire businessman. He is the co-founder of Specsavers, an international optical retail chain.

Early life
Douglas John David Perkins was born in April 1943 in Llanelli, Carmarthenshire, Wales. His father was a policeman and his grandparents were farmers in the county. He was educated at the Llanelli Boys Grammar School, and he graduated from Cardiff University.

Career
Perkins began his career as an optometrist in Llanelli and Carmarthen. In the 1970s, he took over his father-in-law's optician store in Bristol and subsequently opened 22 stores.

Perkins co-founded Specsavers with his wife Mary Perkins in 1984. The company became an international chain of opticians, making them both billionaires. As of April 2016, they have an estimated wealth of £1.55 billion according to the Sunday Times Rich List. In spite of being a billionaire, Perkins calls himself "working-class."

Personal life
Perkins lives in Guernsey with his wife Mary. They have  a son, John, and two daughters, Cathy and Julie.

References

1943 births
Living people
Alumni of Cardiff University
British retail company founders
Guernsey people
People from Llanelli
Welsh billionaires
Welsh company founders